The 74th Regiment of Foot (Invalids) was an infantry regiment of the British Army from 1762 to 1768.

It was originally raised as a regiment of invalids in March 1762, and numbered the 117th Foot; it was renumbered as the 74th the following year, and disbanded in 1768.

References

Infantry regiments of the British Army
1762 disestablishments in Great Britain
Military units and formations disestablished in 1768